Erika Köth (15 September 1925 in Darmstadt – 20 February 1989 in Speyer) was a German operatic high coloratura soprano, particularly associated with the roles of Zerbinetta and Zerlina.

Köth began a musical studies in Darmstadt with Elsa Blank in 1942, and after an interruption resumed them in 1945. She made her stage debut in Kaiserslautern as Philine in Mignon, in 1948, and then sang in Karlsruhe (1950–53). She made her debut at the Munich State Opera and the Vienna State Opera in 1953, and at the Berlin State Opera in 1961. She appeared regularly at the Salzburg Festival (1955–64), as the Queen of the Night and Konstanze and Sophie, and in Bayreuth (1965–68), as the Woodbird. She also made guest appearances in Milan, Paris, London, etc.

Her repertory included: Susanna, Zerlina, Sophie, Despina, Queen of the Night, Lucia, Gilda, Stravinsky's Le Rossignol, and The Rake's Progress.

She had a small but piercing voice of great agility with a range extending remarkably high.

She can be seen on black-and-white video in the role of Rosina in a complete German performance of The Barber of Seville with Fritz Wunderlich, Hermann Prey, and Hans Hotter, and in a German performance of Don Giovanni, with Dietrich Fischer-Dieskau, Donald Grobe, Walter Berry, and Josef Greindl.  Her discography also includes many operetta and lieder recordings.

References
 Grove Music Online, Harold Rosenthal, May 2008.

External links
 THE BARBER OF SEVILLE, with Fritz Wunderlich and Hermann Prey.

1925 births
1989 deaths
Musicians from Darmstadt
German operatic sopranos
Officers Crosses of the Order of Merit of the Federal Republic of Germany
20th-century German women opera singers